Arsinée Khanjian (Western Armenian: Արսինէ Խանճեան, Eastern Armenian: Արսինե Խանջյան; born 6 September 1958) is an Armenian-Canadian actress and activist. She is widely known for her collaborations with her husband, filmmaker Atom Egoyan. She won the 2003 Genie Award for Best Performance by an Actress in a Leading Role for her role in Ararat.

Career 
In addition to her independent work and stage roles, she is regularly cast by her husband, Canadian filmmaker Atom Egoyan, in his films. She has a bachelor's degree in French and Spanish from Concordia University and a master's degree in political science from the University of Toronto.

Khanjian is a civil rights activist and was briefly detained in Armenia in 2016 while protesting human rights abuses.

Personal life 
Her husband, Atom Egoyan, credits her for inspiring him to further explore his Armenian roots. She lives in Toronto with her husband and their son, Arshile.

Khanjian was a jury member for the Cinéfoundation and Short Films sections at the 2012 Cannes Film Festival.

Filmography

Film

Television

Awards and nominations 
 Gemini Award for Best Performance by an Actress in a Continuing Leading Dramatic Role for Foolish Heart (1999) 
 Chlotrudis Society for Independent Film Chloe Award (2002).
 Recipient of the Queen's Golden Jubilee Medal (2002).
 Queen Zabel Award by the Eastern Prelacy of the Armenian Apostolic Church of America (2003).
 Sourp Mesrob Mashdotz Award (2003)
 Durban International Film Festival Winner for Best Actress in Ararat (2003)
 Genie Award for Best Performance by an Actress in a Leading Role in Ararat (2003).
 The Crystal Award for Creative Excellence by Women in Film and Television (2005)

References

External links

Canadian Film Encyclopedia
 

1958 births
Lebanese people of Armenian descent
Lebanese film actresses
Canadian people of Armenian descent
Lebanese emigrants to Canada
Canadian film actresses
Best Actress in a Drama Series Canadian Screen Award winners
Best Actress Genie and Canadian Screen Award winners
Living people
Actresses from Beirut
Concordia University alumni
University of Toronto alumni
Canadian stage actresses
20th-century Canadian actresses
21st-century Canadian actresses
Canadian television actresses
Actresses from Toronto
Ethnic Armenian actresses